Werner Pochath (29 September 1939 – 18 April 1993) was an Austrian film actor. He worked in Germany, Italy and the United States, and then in the 1980s he began a second career as a Hollywood agent.
He had been the partner of the ballet director of the Hamburg State Opera, John Neumeier.

In 2019, director Alexander Wank, made a documentary about Werner, called Werner Pochath, Mr Nice Guy".

Partial filmography

 Stahlnetz:  (1966, TV series episode) as Dieter Hesse
  (1967) as Cutler
 The Long Day of Inspector Blomfield (1968) as Johnny Smith
 Vengeance (1968) as Ricky / Kid
 The Young Tigers of Hong Kong (1969) as Walter
 Angels of the Street (1969) as Herbert Priel
 Venus in Furs (1969) as Manfred
 Slap in the Face (1970) as Jürgen
 The Cat o' Nine Tails (1971) as Manuel
  (1971) as Harry Lang
 The Iguana with the Tongue of Fire (1971) as Marc Sobiesky
  (1972) as Viktor Körner
 Proklisis (1972) as Michalis
 Sonny and Jed (1972) as Pistolero
  (1974) as Rocker
 Challenge to White Fang (1974) as Harvey
  (1974, TV Mini-Series) as Edward Forbes / Johnson / Käpt'n Turner
 Sky Riders (1976) as Number One Terrorist
  (1976) as Boss' Henchman
 Rosemary's Daughter (1976) as Horst
 Casanova & Co. (1977) as Fulcenzo
 BloodLust (1977) as Mosquito
 Kleinhoff Hotel (1977) as David
 Fearless (1978) as Strauss
 Flatfoot in Africa (1978) as Spiros
 Just a Gigolo (1978) as Otto
 Breakthrough (1979) as Schütze Keppel
 The Shark Hunter (1979) as Ramon
 Terror Express (1980) as David
 Maria - Nur die Nacht war ihr Zeuge (1980) as Bernd
 El caníbal (1980) as Chris
  (1982) as Clumsy
 USA, violación y venganza (1983) as Ian Moore
 Rage - Fuoco incrociato (1984) as Victor
 Wallenberg: A Hero's Story (1985, TV Movie) as SS Sergeant
 Wild Team (1985) as Theo
 Target (1985) as Secret agent
 Der Videopirat (1985)
 I giorni dell'inferno (1986) as Prof. Sanders
  (1987) as Major Dietrich
 Lethal Obsession (1987) as Resch
 La sporca insegna del coraggio (1987) as Travis Mills
 Thunder Warrior III (1988) as Colonel Magnum
 Striker (1988) as Houtman
 Let's go crazy (1988)
 Ratman (1988) as Mark
 Red Roses, Call for a Girl (1988) as Ringo
 War and Remembrance (1988, TV Mini-Series) as SS Colonel
 Cop Game (1988) as Kasler
 Born to Fight (1989) as Duan Loc
 Laser Mission (1989) as Eckhardt
 Auntie Lee's Meat Pies (1992) as Billy Bob Himmler
 Venti dal Sud'' (1994) as Max

References

External links
 

1939 births
1993 deaths
Austrian male film actors
Austrian male television actors
Male actors from Vienna
Gay actors
Austrian LGBT actors
AIDS-related deaths in Germany
20th-century Austrian male actors
20th-century LGBT people